Enrico Migliavacca (22 March 1901 – 18 July 1979) was an Italian association football manager and footballer who played as a midfielder. He represented the Italy national football team 11 times, the first being on 20 February 1921, the occasion of a friendly match against France in a 2–1 away win.

References

1901 births
1979 deaths
Italian footballers
Italy international footballers
Association football midfielders
Casale F.B.C. players
Novara F.C. players
Casale F.B.C. managers
Italian football managers